Muzaffar Ali (born 21 October 1944) is an Indian filmmaker, fashion designer, poet, artist, cultural revivalist, and social worker.

Biography
Muzaffar born in Lucknow in 1944.
The eldest son of Raja Syed Sajid Husain Ali, the ruling prince of the principality of Kotwara in Awadh, Muzaffar Ali attended La Martiniere, Lucknow, and graduated in science from Aligarh Muslim University. Ali worked in advertising before turning to film. His first films were Gaman (1978) and Umrao Jaan (1981), and he also made and starred in the TV series Jaan-e-Alam. He later became a fashion designer, creating a fashion label with his wife, Meera, in 1990.

Muzaffar Ali is presently married to Meera Ali, a fashion designer, with whom he has a daughter Sama, who is also a fashion designer. He had two previous marriages, the first of which was to the art historian Geeti Sen, with whom he has a son Murad Ali, a film actor. His second marriage was to the communist politician Subhashini Ali, with whom he has a son Shaad Ali, a film director.

Filmography

 2015: Jaanisaar (also actor)
 1986: Anjuman (also producer)
 1982: Aagaman
 1981: Umrao Jaan (also producer)
 1978: Gaman (also producer)
Unreleased: Zooni (also producer)

Awards
 Padma Shri (2005)
Filmfare Award for Best Director - Umrao Jaan (1981)

References

External links
 
 A man for all arts

La Martinière College, Lucknow alumni
1944 births
Living people
Recipients of the Padma Shri in arts
People from Lakhimpur Kheri
Artists from Lucknow
Samajwadi Party politicians
Hindi-language film directors
Indian documentary filmmakers
Urdu-language film directors
Male actors in Urdu cinema
Male actors from Lucknow
Film directors from Uttar Pradesh
20th-century Indian film directors
21st-century Indian film directors
21st-century Indian male actors
Special Mention (feature film) National Film Award winners
Filmfare Awards winners